Anthony Mieres was a 16th-century influential English Protestant.

Anthony Mieres was one of the Marian exiles. Mary I of England arranged for eleven of the exiles to be arrested for sedition, including Mieres.

References

Year of birth missing
Year of death missing
Marian exiles
English Protestants
16th-century Protestants
16th-century English people